is a Japanese actress who is represented by the talent agency Toho Entertainment.

Biography
Yamazaki won the Special Jury Prize at the 7th Toho Cinderella Audition. Her first film appearance is in We Were There and her first television drama appearance is in Kōkō Nyūshi. Yamazaki later appeared in films such as Kyō, Koi o Hajimemasu, Kono Sora no Hana, and Lesson of the Evil.

In 2012, she served as the official image character of the Meiji University Rugby Club, and was appointed as an image model in the 50th National University Rugby Football Championship in 2013. Yamazaki was also an image model in the 51st National University Rugby Football Championship in 2014.

In 2013, she served as the festival navigator in the Tokyo International Film Festival.

In 2014, Yamazaki's first heroine role was in Kami-sama no Iu Toori as Ichika Akimoto.

Filmography

Drama

Variety

Films

Dubbing
Night at the Museum: Secret of the Tomb (Shepseheret (Anjali Jay))

References

External links
 Official profile 

1994 births
Living people
Actors from Chiba Prefecture
21st-century Japanese actresses